Reverend Henry Cadwallader Adams (4 November 1817 – 17 October 1899) was a 19th-century English cleric, schoolmaster and writer of children's novels.

He was the grandson of Simon Adams of Ansty Hall, Warwickshire. He was educated at Westminster School, Winchester College, Balliol College (1835) and Magdalen College, Oxford (1836), becoming a fellow of Magdalen in 1843.  After some time as a Commoner Tutor at Winchester, in 1855 he became chaplain of Bromley College, an almshouse for the widows of clergy.

Works

Fiction
Adams wrote children's novels, specialising in tales of Victorian Public School life and adventures in far-flung parts of Empire. His novels included:
 The Cherry-stones, or Charlton School (1851)
 Who Did It?, or Holmwood Priory. A Schoolboy's Tale (1852)
 Sivan the Sleeper (1857)
 Schoolboy Honour; a tale of Halminster College (1861)
 The Indian Boy (1865)
 Balderscourt, or Holiday Tales (1866)
 Falconshurst; or, Birthday tales (1869)
 Hair-breadth escapes, or, The adventures of three boys in South Africa London: Griffith & Farran (1876)
 The Boy Cavaliers, or The Siege of Clidesford (1878)
 The Winborough Boys, or Ellerslie Park (1879)
 Perils in the Transvaal and Zululand London: Griffith, Farran, Okeden & Welsh (1887)
 Travellers' Tales: a book of marvels (1883)
 Wroxby College, Or, the Luscombe Prize: A Tale of Boy Life
 School and University; Or, Dolph Woodward
 The Mystery of Beechey Grange Or the Missing Host: A Tale for Boys
 College days at Oxford, or, Wilton of Cuthbert's (1887)
 The Lost Rifle, or, Schoolboy Faction
 Schooldays at Kingscourt

School textbooks
 A New Greek Delectus, London, 3rd edition (1855)
 Greek Exercises, Adapted to Adams's Greek Delectus, and Wordsworth's Greek Grammar (1856)
 A New Latin Delectus: Adapted to the Arrangement of the Eton, and Edward the Sixth's Latin Grammars (1857)
 Latin Exercises, Adapted to the Arrangement of the Eton and Edward VI's Grammars, and Adams's Latin Delectus
 Adams's Principia Graeca, Being a Grammar and Delectus Combined (1871)

Religious
 The Greek text of the Gospels: with prolegomena, notes and references, for the use of schools and colleges (1886)
 The Judges of Israel, or Tales for Sunday Reading
 Sunday Evenings at Home (1880)
 Sundays at Encombe
 The History of the Jews from the war with Rome to the present time (1887)

Poetry
 The twelve foundations and other poems (1859)

Other
 Wykehamica: A History of Winchester College and Commoners: Oxford, London and Winchester (1878)

References
 Victorian Novels of Public School Life Christopher Stray (2003) 
 Wainewright, John Bannerman (ed). Winchester College 1836–1906: A Register. P. and G. Wells, 1907.
 Bloxam, J. R., A Register of the Presidents, Fellows, Demies, Instructors in Grammar and in Music, Chaplains, Clerks, Choristers, and Other Members of Saint Mary Magdalen College in the University of Oxford: The demies. v. 1-4; 1482-1857 (1873)
 The Oxford Magazine (1900) vol 18 p 21
 Notes and Queries 1906 p 285

External links

 
 
 

1817 births
19th-century English writers
People educated at Winchester College
1899 deaths
English children's writers
19th-century English male writers